First-seeded Shirley Bloomer defeated Dorothy Knode 6–1, 6–3 in the final to win the women's singles tennis title at the 1957 French Championships.

Seeds
The seeded players are listed below. Shirley Bloomer is the champion; others show the round in which they were eliminated.

  Shirley Bloomer (champion)
  Dorothy Knode (finalist)
  Christiane Mercelis (quarterfinals)
  Edda Buding (third round)
  Darlene Hard (quarterfinals)
  Mary Hawton (third round)
  Silvana Lazzarino (second round)
  Annalissa Bellani (third round)
  Zsuzsi Körmöczy (quarterfinals)
  Heather Brewer (quarterfinals)
  Jacqueline Kermina (second round)
  Ginette Bucaille (second round)
  Vera Puzejova (semifinals)
  Erika Vollmer (third round)
  Pilar Barril (third round)
  Yola Ramírez (third round)

Draw

Key
 Q = Qualifier
 WC = Wild card
 LL = Lucky loser
 r = Retired

Finals

Earlier rounds

Section 1

Section 2

Section 3

Section 4

References

External links
   on the French Open website

1957 in women's tennis
1957
1957 in French women's sport
1957 in French tennis